War Hill is a summit in the U.S. state of Georgia.

War Hill was named for the fact the Battle of Kettle Creek (1779) was fought here.

References

Mountains of Wilkes County, Georgia
Mountains of Georgia (U.S. state)